The Leeward 16 is an American sailing dinghy that was designed by Luger Industries and first built in 1962.

Production
The design was built by Luger Industries in Burnsville, Minnesota, United States starting in 1962. The company produced it as a kit boat for amateur construction, which the building time estimated at 10–15 hours. The company went out of business in 1987 and the boat is now out of production.

Design
The Leeward 16 is a recreational sailboat, built predominantly of fiberglass, with wood trim. It has a fractional sloop rig with anodized aluminum spars. The hull features a spooned raked stem, a conventional transom, a rounded, transom-hung rudder controlled by a tiller and a retractable centerboard. It displaces  and has an angular cuddy cabin for stowage.

Ground transportation on a trailer is facilitated by a hinged tabernacle that permits easy lowering of the mast by easing the forestay.

Other factory options included sails, trim molding and
running lights for night operation. Foam for hull buoyancy was recommended to make the boat unsinkable.

For sailing the design is equipped with mainsail roller reefing around the boom. The jib sheets, mainsheet and the centerboard raising and lowering lines are all controlled from the cockpit. The supplied assembly kit included stainless steel and anodized aluminum fittings.

The design has a Portsmouth Yardstick racing average handicap of 112.3 and is normally raced with a crew of two sailors.

Operational history
In a 1994 review Richard Sherwood wrote, "Luger Industries buil[t] kit boats [that] rang[e] in length from 8 feet
to 30 feet. The Leeward 16 is typical."

Sailrite describes the design, "the Luger Leeward 16 has plenty of cockpit space for the family and enough room in the small cuddy cabin for a picnic basket and cooler. With a modest sail plan the Luger Leeward 16 is an excellent boat for those learning to sail."

See also
List of sailing boat types

Similar sailboats
Balboa 16
Catalina 16.5
DS-16
Laguna 16
Martin 16
Nordica 16
Tanzer 16

References

Dinghies
1960s sailboat type designs
Two-person sailboats
Sailboat type designs by Luger Industries
Sailboat types built by Luger Industries